The 1987–88 season was the 86th in the history of the Western Football League.

The league champions for the first time in their history were Liskeard Athletic. The champions of Division One were Welton Rovers.

Final tables

Premier Division
The Premier Division remained at 22 clubs after Chard Town were relegated to the First Division. One club joined:

Swanage Town & Herston, champions of the First Division.

First Division
The First Division was reduced from 22 to 19 clubs, after Swanage Town & Herston were promoted to the Premier Division, Wimborne Town were transferred to the Wessex League, Portway Bristol disbanded and Weymouth Reserves also left. One new club joined:

Chard Town, relegated from the Premier Division.

References

Western Football League seasons
6